Five Mile Airport  is a private-use airport located in Five Mile (or Five Mile Camp) in the U.S. state of Alaska. The airport is owned by the United States Bureau of Land Management (BLM) - Pipeline Office and managed by the Alyeska Pipeline Company. It is also known as Five Mile Camp Airport.

Facilities and aircraft 
Five Mile Airport has one runway designated 11/29 with a gravel surface measuring 2,700 by 75 feet (823 x 23 m). For the 12-month period ending August 30, 1994, the airport had 200 general aviation aircraft operations, an average of 16 per month.

References

External links 
 Aerial view of Five Mile Camp, with landing strip at left, during Trans-Alaska Pipeline construction, five miles north of Yukon River in Interior Alaska. Dec. 19, 1974.
 
 FAA Alaska airport diagram (GIF)
 Resources for this airport:
 
 

Airports in the Yukon–Koyukuk Census Area, Alaska
Bureau of Land Management